Cantharellus cinereus, the ashen chanterelle, is a species of Cantharellus found growing in coniferous forest in Europe.

Description 
Cantharellus cinereus are greyish-black chanterelle mushrooms with thin, dark grey flesh that fades when dry.

Cap: 2-4cm. Irregular funnel shape/infundibuliform. Irregularly wavy at the edges with an inrolled margin. Stem: 2-4cm. Smooth to lightly velvety in texture sometimes with a white woolly base. Veins/Ridges: Dark grey irregular forks which are distant and decurrent. Spore print: White. Spores: Broadly elliptical, smooth, non-amyloid. 7.5-10 x 5-6 μm. Taste: Mild. Smell: Indistinct.

Habitat and distribution 
As a mycorrhizal species it grows on soil with leaf litter in broad-leaves woods and is usually found in small groups and may be trooping. It is also rarely found with conifers. It has a widespread distribution but is an uncommon find with mushrooms appearing during Autumn.

Edibility 
C. cinereus is an edible mushroom with a mild taste. Can be used similarly to black trumpets (Craterellus cornucopioides) but with a milder taste. Possible lookalikes include Craterellus cornucopioides, Pseudocraterellus undulatus and Faerberia carbonaria, all of which are edible.

References

External links
 
 

cinereus